Stefania LaVie Owen is a New Zealand-American actress. She is known for her roles as Puddle Kadubic in the television series Running Wilde and as Dorrit Bradshaw in the teen drama television series The Carrie Diaries. She starred as Melanie in the film Paper Spiders, as Bear in the Netflix show Sweet Tooth, and as Nicole Chance in the Hulu original psychological thriller Chance.

Early life
Owen was born in Miami, Florida, to an American mother and a New Zealand father. Her mother is of Cuban descent.

Owen lives between New York City and Wellington. She attended Pauatahanui school, where she won the cup for performing arts, and which helped begin her career in acting. She also attended Chilton Saint James School, an all-girls private school, in Lower Hutt, Wellington. Her sisters Lolo and Carly accompanied her there as well, and she was involved in many school productions and dancing classes.

Career
Owen made her acting debut in the 2009 Peter Jackson film The Lovely Bones, playing Flora Hernandez. From 2010 to 2011, she played the character Puddle Kadubic in the Fox comedy series Running Wilde. Owen co-starred as Dorrit, Carrie Bradshaw's younger rebellious sister, in The CW's The Carrie Diaries, which aired in 2013 and 2014.

She had a role in the 2015 comedy horror film, Krampus, directed by Michael Dougherty. She also portrayed Deedee in the drama film Coming Through the Rye. She starred opposite Lili Taylor in the drama Paper Spiders.
She also co-started in Messiah as Rebecca in 2020.

Filmography

References

External links
 
 

21st-century American actresses
Actresses from Miami
American film actresses
American people of New Zealand descent
American television actresses
New Zealand child actresses
Living people
People from Porirua
21st-century New Zealand actresses
New Zealand television actresses
New Zealand film actresses
Year of birth missing (living people)
People educated at Chilton Saint James School